Eutreta obliqua is a species of tephritid or fruit flies in the genus Eutreta of the family Tephritidae.

Distribution
Colombia, Ecuador.

References

Tephritinae
Insects described in 1977
Diptera of South America